The Mongolian and Tibetan Affairs Commission (MTAC) was a ministry-level commission of the Executive Yuan in the Republic of China. It was disbanded on 15 September 2017.

History 

The first model was created during the Qing dynasty in 1636 as the Mongolian Bureau, later reformed into the Lifan Yuan in 1639, and oversaw the relationship of the Qing court to its Mongolian and Tibetan territories. During the reign of the Kangxi Emperor, the bureau was renamed to Minority Affairs Council. In 1906, during the reign of the Guangxu Emperor, it was renamed to Ministry of Minority Affairs (理藩部).

Following the Xinhai Revolution and the collapse of the Qing dynasty, the section was replaced by Mongolian and Tibetan Affairs Agency under the Ministry of the Interior in April 1912. In July 1912, the agency was again renamed as Bureau of Mongolian and Tibetan Affairs and placed under the State Affairs Yuan. In 1914, it was reorganized and being placed directly under the supervision of President. On 1 February 1929, it was finally changed to Mongolian and Tibetan Affairs Commission (MTAC) in accordance with the Nationalist Government Organizational Law. After the Communist revolution in 1949, and the central government of China's relocation to Taiwan, formerly a Qing province turned colony that was acquired from Japan in 1945 after the end of World War II, the MTAC ceased its activities in Tibet and Mongolia, although it served as a governmental body which assisted in the relationship between ethnic Mongols and Tibetans in Taiwan and increasing the communication between the Taiwanese and the Mongols as well as the Tibetans.

After the 1959 Tibetan uprising, Chiang Kai-shek announced in his Letter to Tibetan Compatriots that the ROC's policy would be to help the Tibetan people overthrow the People's Republic of China's rule in Tibet. The MTAC sent secret agents to India to disseminate pro-Kuomintang (KMT) and anti-Communist propaganda among Tibetan exiles. From 1971 to 1978, the MTAC also recruited ethnic Tibetan children from India and Nepal to study in Taiwan, with the expectation that they would work for a ROC government that returned to the mainland.

On 14 August 2017, the Executive Yuan, now led by the independence minded Democratic Progressive Party (DPP) administration, announced that the MTAC would be dissolved by the end of the year. No budget was allocated to the MTAC for 2018. Employees and responsibilities of the commission were re-assigned to two places; the Mongolian and Tibetan Cultural Center under the Ministry of Culture, and the expanded Department of Hong Kong, Macao, Inner Mongolia, and Tibet Affairs under the Mainland Affairs Council.

Organizational structure 
 Commissioners
 Secretary's Office
 Counselor's Office
 Department of Mongolian Affairs
 Department of Tibetan Affairs
 Department of General Affairs
 Compilation and Translation
 Accounting Office
 Personnel Office
 Civil Service Ethics Office

Ministers

Political Party:

Other notable members 
 Thubten Choekyi Nyima, 9th Panchen Lama
 Wu Heling
 Pandatsang Rapga

Mongolian and Tibetan Cultural Center 

The Mongolian and Tibetan Cultural Center was originally managed by the Mongolian and Tibetan Affairs Commission. It is located in the Daan District of Taipei on Qingtian Street near the Taipei Grand Mosque and Mandarin Training Center. The center was established in 1993 in the former residence of the Changkya Khutukhtu, Lobsang Pelden Tenpe Dronme, who fled to Taiwan after the Chinese Civil War in 1949. The building incorporates traditional Tibetan architectural features. It also includes an exhibition area for cultural artifacts, a reading room, lecture hall and prayer hall for the Changkya Khutukhtu. After the commission was disbanded, the center's management was turned over to the Ministry of Culture.

See also 

 Executive Yuan
 Republic of China (1912–49)
 Tibet (1912–51)
 Mongolia (1911–24)
 Mongolia–Taiwan relations
 Mongolians in Taiwan

 Similar government agencies
 Bureau of Buddhist and Tibetan Affairs (Yuan dynasty)
 Lifan Yuan (Qing dynasty)
 State Ethnic Affairs Commission (People's Republic of China)

References

External links 

 Mongolian and Tibetan Cultural Center

1912 establishments in China
2017 disestablishments in Taiwan
Anti-communist organizations
Executive Yuan
Government agencies established in 1912
Government agencies disestablished in 2017
China
Mongolia–Taiwan relations
Taiwan–Tibet relations